Pannonhalma is a district in south-eastern part of Győr-Moson-Sopron County. Győr is also the name of the town where the district seat is found. The district is located in the Western Transdanubia Statistical Region.

Geography 
Pannonhalma District borders with Győr District to the north and west, Kisbér District (Komárom-Esztergom County) to the east, Zirc District (Veszprém County) to the southeast, Pápa District (Veszprém County) to the southwest. The number of the inhabited places in Pannonhalma District is 17.

Municipalities 
The district has 1 town and 16 villages.
(ordered by population, as of 1 January 2012)

The bolded municipality is the city.

Demographics

In 2011, it had a population of 15,227 and the population density was 49/km².

Ethnicity
Besides the Hungarian majority, the main minorities are the Roma (approx. 250) and German (200).

Total population (2011 census): 15,227
Ethnic groups (2011 census): Identified themselves: 13,609 persons:
Hungarians: 13,003 (95.59%)
Gypsies: 245 (1.80%)
Germans: 208 (1.53%)
Others and indefinable: 153 (1.12%)
Approx. 1,500 persons in Pannonhalma District did not declare their ethnic group at the 2011 census.

Religion
Religious adherence in the county according to 2011 census:

Catholic – 8,692 (Roman Catholic – 8,656; Greek Catholic – 36);
Reformed – 1,177;
Evangelical – 599;
other religions – 148; 
Non-religious – 826; 
Atheism – 53;
Undeclared – 3,732.

See also
List of cities and towns in Hungary

References

External links
 Postal codes of the Pannonhalma District

Districts in Győr-Moson-Sopron County